Kesavan is both a surname and a given name. Notable people with the name include:
p .kesavan,b.tech it
B. S. Kesavan, Indian librarian
C. Kesavan (1891–1969), Indian politician, lawyer and activist
C. G. Kesavan (1895–1980), Indian journalist
H. K. Kesavan, Indian academic
Mukul Kesavan, Indian writer
Sudhakar Kesavan, Indian engineer
Kesavan Soon (born 1939), Singaporean sprinter
 J. Kesavan banker

See also
Keshavan